The Catholic Church in Turkmenistan is part of the worldwide Catholic Church, under the spiritual leadership of the Pope in Rome.

History 
All Catholic infrastructure in the country was destroyed by Soviet revolutionaries in the 1920s. In 1997 a request was made to recognize the local Catholic community, but was refused since the local church was not headed by a Turkmen. As of 2010, the church had approximately 100 members and 30 catechumens. In July 2010, the Catholic Mission received official government recognition. Plans are underway to ask permission to build a Catholic church, and to reclaim a Catholic Armenian church in Turkmenbasy that still stands in the west of the country, as well as a church building in Sendar. There are currently two priests and a deacon serving the Catholic population. Mass is celebrated at the Papal embassy in the capital and at parishioners' homes.

See also 
Religion in Turkmenistan
Christianity in Turkmenistan
Chapel of the Transfiguration, Ashgabat
Mission sui iuris of Turkmenistan

References

External links 
Profile of Catholic Church in Turkmenistan
Catholic Church in Turkmenistan

 
Turkmenistan
Turkmenistan